Andrei Popov may refer to:
Andrei Alexandrovich Popov (1821–1898), Russian admiral
Andrei Alekseyevich Popov (1918–1983), Soviet actor
Andrei Andreyevich Popov (1832-1896), Russian painter
Andrei Popov (ice hockey) (born 1988), Russian ice hockey player
Andrei Popov (politician) (born 1971), Moldovan politician 2009–2013